Crack Your Heels is a 1919 American short comedy film featuring Harold Lloyd.

Cast
 Harold Lloyd as The Boy
 Snub Pollard 
 Bebe Daniels  
 Sammy Brooks
 Billy Fay
 Lew Harvey
 Wallace Howe
 Margaret Joslin (as Margaret Joslyn)
 Marie Mosquini
 Fred C. Newmeyer
 James Parrott
 William Petterson
 Noah Young

See also
 List of American films of 1919
 Harold Lloyd filmography

External links

1919 films
American silent short films
American black-and-white films
Films directed by Alfred J. Goulding
1919 comedy films
1919 short films
Silent American comedy films
American comedy short films
1910s American films
1910s English-language films